The Ida is a kind of sword used by the Yoruba people of West Africa.

It is a long sword with a narrow to wide blade and sheathe. The sword is sharp, and cuts on contact but typically begins to dull if not sharpened regularly. It can be single-edged or double-edged. These blades are typically heavier by the tip of the blade.

During wars, pepper and poison are added to it to paralyze anyone who is cut by the sword.  It can be wielded in any way (either one-handed or two-handed). The Yoruba people use this sword for hunting, war and other uses. The blade of the sword is in an elongated leaf-shaped form. It is designed for cutting and hacking.

Production
The Yoruba blacksmiths were among the most skilled in West Africa. They employed different techniques in the making of these Ida swords. They were involved in the mining and smelting of iron ore before 800 A.D. This style of sword was also sometimes used by other surrounding peoples such as the Bini and the Igbo.

Variations
There were many other variations of the Idà. The Yoruba also used many other bladed-weapons.

Some of them were;

Àdá—Used for clearing brush, fighting, or hunting. It is similar to a cutlass or machete.
Ọ̀bẹ—Daggers carried by the Yoruba soldiers.
Agẹ̀dẹ̀ngbẹ—Single-bladed and eccentrically curved. Also quite heavy.
Tanmogayi—Similar to the sabre.
Abara—A similar double-edged sword to the Idà, used by the Ika people of Delta state, Nigeria. 
Asara—Also used by the Ika people, it is similar to the Ada

References

See also
Yoruba people
Types of swords
Sword

Blade weapons
African swords
Yoruba words and phrases